Pilodeudorix hugoi, the Hugo's diopetes, is a butterfly in the family Lycaenidae. It is found in Nigeria (the Cross River loop), Cameroon, Gabon, the Republic of the Congo, the Central African Republic, the Democratic Republic of the Congo, western Uganda and north-western Tanzania. The habitat consists of forests.

References

Butterflies described in 2004
Deudorigini